Byrd Canyon is an undersea canyon named for Admiral Richard E. Byrd. The name was approved by the Advisory Committee for Undersea Features in June 1988.

References
 

Canyons and gorges of Antarctica
Landforms of the Ross Dependency
King Edward VII Land